John Joseph Frederick Otto Zardetti ( January 24, 1847 –  May 10, 1902) was a Swiss prelate of the Roman Catholic Church.  He served as archbishop of the Archdiocese of Bucharest in what is today Romania from 1894 to 1895.

Zardetti previously served as the first bishop of the new Diocese of Saint Cloud in Minnesota in the United States from 1889 to 1894.  After resigning as archbishop, Zardetti briefly served in the Roman Curia with the title of titular archbishop of Mocissus.

Biography

Early life 
Otto Zardetti was born on January 24, 1847, in Rorschach, Switzerland, to Eugen Zardetti and Annette Anna, born von Bayer, an upper-middle-class family who dealt in canvas and colonial goods. His ancestors had moved to Switzerland from Villa, Val Anasca, Italy, at the end of the eighteenth century, because his grandfather had married into the patrician family von Bayer.

Zardetti attended the local primary and secondary school in Rorschach, then the Stella Matutina school in Feldkirch, Austria.  He then returned to Switzerland, where he entered the Episcopalian boy's seminary in St. Georgen next to the city of St. Gallen. Zardetti received his university education in theology and philosophy from the University of Innsbruck in Innsbruck, Austria.

Because of his talent for languages, Zardetti was invited by Bishop Karl Johann Greith to attend the First Vatican Council in Rome from November 1869 to Spring 1870.  While in Rome, Zardetti met the future Bishop Martin Marty, another Swiss priest.   Returning to Innsbruck, Zardetti received a Doctor of Theology degree from the University of Innsbruck in 1870.

Priesthood 
Zardetti was ordained to the priesthood by Bishop Benedetto Riccabona de Reinchenfels in 1870 in St. Gallen. His fluency in French, English and Italian as well as German brought him a post as professor in rhetoric in St. Georgen (1871-1874). After that he became director of the Abbey Library of Saint Gall (1874-1876) and then canon (Domkustos) at the Diocese of St. Gallen (1876-1881).

In 1879, Zardetti embarked on a four month trip to America.  Returning to Switzerland, he soon received an offer from Archbishop Michael Heiss of the Archdiocese of Milwaukee to teach dogmatics at the Metropolitan Seminary of Wisconsin. Zardetti arrived in Wisconsin in late 1881. In 1887, Bishop Marty appointed Zardetti as general vicar for the Dakota Vicariate.

Bishop of Saint Cloud 
Pope Leo XIII appointed Zardetti on October 3, 1889, to be the first bishop of the Diocese of St. Cloud. Traveling in Europe at that time, he was consecrated in Einsiedlen, Switzerland, on October 20, 1889, by Archbishop William Gross.  Zardetti immediately started construction of a suitable building to serve as the diocesan cathedral.  He worked to enlarge the parochial school system and created a newspaper for the diocese.  Zardetti became known throughout the country for his oratorical skills.

Suffering from chronic health problems that were aggravated by the harsh Minnesota climate and much traveling, Zardetti requested that the Vatican transfer him back in Europe.

Archbishop of Bucharest and member of Curia 
Leo XIII appointed Zardetti as archbishop of the Archdiocese Bucharest on March 6, 1894.  However, his health again became a problem.  In response, Leo XIII accepted Zardetti's resignation on May 25, 1895 as archbishop of Bucharest, appointed him titular archbishop of Mocissus and named him to the Roman Curia.  He became a canon to the Church of Saint John Lateran in Rome and as a consultor to two districts. He was named as an assistant to the papal throne in 1899.  During this period, Zardetti expressed his desire to visit Saint Cloud, but his health problems prevented it.

Otto Zardetti died in Rome on May 10, 1902, at age 55.

References

1847 births
1902 deaths
Roman Catholic Ecclesiastical Province of Saint Paul and Minneapolis
Swiss emigrants to the United States
Roman Catholic bishops of Saint Cloud
19th-century Roman Catholic bishops in the United States
People from Rorschach, Switzerland
19th-century Roman Catholic bishops in the Ottoman Empire